whereis is a command on Unix and Unix-like operating systems used to locate some special files of a command like the binary file, source and manual page files.

Syntax 
The whereis man page provides the following sample usage:
% # Find all files in /usr/bin which are not documented in /usr/man/man1 with source in /usr/src:
% cd /usr/bin
% whereis -u -M /usr/man/man1 -S /usr/src -f *

Analogs 
The Unix type command is similar, but it identifies aliases.

Modern versions of Microsoft Windows feature a similar command: where.

The origin may Multics where.

See also 
 List of Unix commands
 command (shell builtin)
 which (command)
 type (Unix)
 hash (Unix)

References

External links 
man page of whereis command
Command whereis – 10 practical examples 

Unix user management and support-related utilities